Vinga is a commune in Arad County, western Romania, south of the county seat of Arad, with a population of 5,828 inhabitants (as of 2011). 
Vinga is located in the northern section of the Banat. The people in Vinga are mainly Romanians, the second largest ethnic group being Hungarians. There is a Bulgarian minority of Catholic faith, known as the Banat Bulgarians, who have historically been the dominant ethnicity in Vinga.

History
The first evidence of Vinga's existence as a small village dates back to 1231 A.D. After Vinga was destroyed by Turks during the expansion of the Ottoman Empire, Vinga was repopulated in the year 1741 with 125 families of ethnic Bulgarians from Chiprovtsi, joined later by Romanians from the surrounding area. After World War I, a majority of these Bulgarian families moved to Arad and Timișoara. After World War II, more and more Bulgarians moved to Vinga and began to own large and important pieces of land in the area. During the communist regime of Nicolae Ceauşescu, the government promised to contribute and renovate Vinga so that it could be recognized as a small town. However, these promises were not kept because the revolution of 1989 occurred and a new government was formed.

Religion
When Bulgarians came to Vinga, they brought with them their culture, their language, and also their religion of Roman Catholicism. The imposing Catholic church, which was built by ethnic Bulgarians in the early 1890s, can be seen from afar. There is also an Orthodox church, which represents the main religion of Romanians living in the area. Furthermore, there is a Baptist church, which holds around 30 members, and a Pentecostal church which is located near the Baptist church.

Population and ethnic changes

Demographics 
At the 2011 census, the commune had 5828 inhabitants. Of these 58.11% were ethnic Romanians, 20.86% Hungarians, 11.06% Roma, 5.57% Bulgarians, 2.59% Slovaks, 0.9% Ukrainians and 0.2% Serbs. The commune is composed of three villages:

Travel and transportation
There is a major European road running through Vinga (E671), connecting it to Arad to the North and Timișoara to the South. Vinga also has a train station running the same general direction as the road, connecting these two major cities, Arad and Timișoara. Many people in Vinga commute to one of these cities to work. Being a commune, it has two associate small towns (villages) in its administrative jurisdiction: Mănăștur and Mailat.

Natives
Stefan Dunjov
Eusebius Fermendžin

Gallery

References

External links

Varga E. Statistică recensăminte după limba maternă, respectiv naţionalitate, jud. Arad 1880–1992
Recensământ 2002

Communes in Arad County
Localities in Romanian Banat
Bulgarian communities in Romania